The Ayers Island Reservoir is an impoundment located on the Pemigewasset River in central New Hampshire, United States, in the towns of Bristol and New Hampton.

Lakes of Belknap County, New Hampshire
Lakes of Grafton County, New Hampshire
Reservoirs in New Hampshire